"Tower of Soul" is a 2011 smooth jazz song recorded by Patrick Yandall. The song was included on his album Samoa Soul, and it was charted at number 28 on Billboard's Smooth Jazz Songs.

References 

2011 songs
Song articles with missing songwriters